Keelvani is a village lying on the bank of the Bhavani River, between Athani and Appakudal, Erode district, Tamil Nadu.

Villages in Erode district